Chart Leacon Traction and Rolling Stock Maintenance Depot was at one time a railway depot located in Ashford, Kent, England.

The depot code is AF.

History
In 1987, the depot had an allocation of Class 09 shunters, and was used for stabling DEMUs and EMUs. Chart Leacon is now closed with its successor "Ramsgate EMU Depot" acquiring all class 375 stock.

Allocation 
In 2014, the depot's allocation consisted of Southeastern Class 375/3/6 EMUs.

Reopening plans 
On 5 January 2019, Network Rail proposed plans to restore the sidings and stable Southeastern trains which will be displaced due to new Thameslink services using the existing Hitachi depot. The landowner appealed against Ashford Council's approval of this project, but the High Court ruled in favour of the Council.

References

Bibliography

Railway depots in England
Rail transport in Kent